Mary Brown or Browne may refer to:

 Mary Brown, alias for Typhoid Mary (1869–1938), first identified asymptomatic carrier of typhoid fever in the United States
 Mary Brown (author) (1929–1999), British fantasy and science fiction author
 Mary Brown (Michigan politician) (1935–2021), American politician and educator
 Mary Brown (nurse) (1840–1936), nurse and soldier in the American Civil War
 Mary Brown Bullock (born in 1940s), American academic specializing in Chinese history
 Mary Browne (1891–1971), American tennis player
 Mary Browne, Countess of Southampton (1552–1603), English peer
 Mary Ann Browne (1812–1845), English poet and writer of musical scores
 Mary Ann Day Brown (1816–1884), wife of John Brown (abolitionist)
 Mary Annora Brown (1899–1987), Canadian artist
 Mary Babnik Brown (1907–1991), American who donated her hair for using as bombsight crosshairs 
 Mary Bonaventure Browne (17th century), Irish abbess and historian
 Mary Elizabeth Brown (1862–1952), first female graduate of the University of Sydney
 Mary Laurene Browne (born 1944), Catholic sister, educator and president of Stella Maris Polytechnic University
 Mary Louise Brown (1868–1927), first African-American woman to receive a wartime medical commission 
 Mary Ward Brown (1917–2013), American short-story writer and memoirist
 Mary Browne (courtier) (1593–1692), English aristocrat
 Mary Elizabeth Adams Brown (1842–1918), American writer, collector, and curator of musical instruments
 "Mary Brown", a song by Irving Berlin

See also 
Mary Brown's (founded in 1969), restaurant chain in Canada